Selling Blue Elephants: How to Make Great Products That People Want Before They Even Know They Want Them is a book written by Howard Moskowitz and Alex Gofman (Publisher: Wharton School Publishing 2007).

The book outlines a new solution-oriented learning experience co-developed with Prof. Jerry (Yoram) Wind of Wharton School of Business - Rule Developing Experimentation (RDE).
 
RDE is the systematized process of designing, testing and modifying alternative ideas, packages, products, or services in a disciplined way so that the developer and marketer discover what appeals to the customer, even if the customer can't articulate the need, much less the solution. The book describes best practices in the RDE from some of today's top companies: HP, Prego, Vlasic, MasterCard and others. Filled with real-life stories, this book changes the way people think about selling to their present and future customers.

The book is currently under contracts to be translated and published in Germany, Italy, Spain (both full and digest), Japan, Indonesia, Taiwan (Chinese Traditional), China (Chinese Simplified), South Korea, Russia, Netherlands, Lebanon, Romania (both full and digest), Thailand, India, Lithuania and Vietnam.

External links
 www.SellingBlueElephants.com
 www.Ideamap.NET
 www.mji-designlab.com
 www.mindgenomics.com

Business books
2007 non-fiction books